Stockton Terminal and Eastern No. 1 is a 4-4-0 steam locomotive originally built in 1864 by Norris-Lancaster for the first Western Pacific Railroad. The railroad's engines were lettered rather than numbered, and as such this engine received the "G" designation, as well as given the name "Mariposa." The engine operated on the Western Pacific until the late 1860s when the road went bankrupt and was subsequently purchased by the Central Pacific Railroad.

In 1869, the Central Pacific had re-designated the engine as the road's second number 31, replacing another engine of that number which was destroyed in an accident that year, and continued to serve the CP, as well as the Southern Pacific Railroad (which absorbed the road in 1885), until 1914.  The engine is believed to have been stripped of its name in the 1870s, when the CP had ceased its practice of naming engines, and has been renumbered 1193 in 1891.  The engine was renumbered 1215 in 1901, then again as 1488 in 1907. 

In 1914 the engine was sold to the Stockton Terminal and Eastern Railroad, and served that road until 1953. In that year, the engine was retired from 89 years of revenue service and donated to the Travel Town Museum, where it is currently displayed.

See also 
 List of preserved Southern Pacific Railroad rolling stock

References

External links 
Travel Town Museum Foundation

Individual locomotives of the United States
Southern Pacific Railroad locomotives
4-4-0 locomotives
Standard gauge locomotives of the United States
Railway locomotives introduced in 1864
Preserved steam locomotives of California